Rupert Sinclair Hill (born 15 June 1978) is an English actor. He is known for his roles in several soap operas.

Hill started with small roles on television. He appeared in an episode of EastEnders as Robbie's half-brother Kevin Bolton, and also played a part in a music video by the band Haven.

Hill subsequently went into the ongoing role of Cameron Davenport in daily serial Family Affairs, a role he played from 2002 to 2004. He was then cast in Coronation Street, as Danny Baldwin's (Bradley Walsh) son Jamie Baldwin in 2004.

Hill played guitar in the defunct band Shepherd's Pi which he formed with former Family Affairs co-stars Sam Stockman and Angela Hazeldine. He now leads a new group called Biederbeck, who have performed several gigs in Manchester, London and at Ramsbottom Festival and Bestival on the Isle of Wight.

In April 2007, it was announced in the media that Hill had quit his role as Jamie in Coronation Street, a move which has left the street without a member of the Baldwin family for the first time in 30 years.

Hill is also part of a small comedy sketch group, Screaming Mess, where he co-writes and performs in many varied comedy sketches and parodies along with childhood friends Jamie Langrish and Marc Norris.

In July 2008, Hill appeared in five episodes of The Bill titled Gun Runner as Kieran Wallace, a small-time criminal who was eventually shot dead in the fifth and final part of the Gunrunner storyline during an attempted revenge mission armed with a MAC-10 sub-machine gun.

Hill is married to Jenny Platt who played his on-screen girlfriend Violet Wilson in Coronation Street. The couple reside in Manchester, where Hill co-owns several pubs, including the Castle Hotel and Gulliver's, situated on Oldham Street in the Northern Quarter, and the Eagle Inn in Salford. It was announced on This Morning that Rupert and Jenny were expecting a child together, 24 September 2009; she was born the following year.

In 2012 Hill appeared in the British horror film 'Entity' starring alongside Dervla Kirwan and Charlotte Riley. In September 2014, Hill will begin playing the role of Guy in the touring production of The Full Monty.

Hill has directed two short films "Roll With the Punches" and "Molehills" (which he also wrote). In 2018 he appeared in Hollyoaks as Josh Bradley.

TV

References

External links

 Interview in the Canadian Hungarian Journal

English male soap opera actors
1978 births
Living people
Alumni of Middlesex University